Árón Taylor-Smith (né Smith; Born 9 November 1989) is an Irish racing driver currently racing in the British Touring Car Championship for Team HARD. He is the younger brother of former VX Racing BTCC driver Gavin Smith.

Racing career

Karting
Born in Dublin, Taylor-Smith began his racing career in karting in 2004 at various tracks around Ireland such as Mondello Park and Athboy, he was the 2005 JICA Irish Kart Club Champion. He followed this up by becoming the Irish Open Kart Champion in 2006.

Renault Clio Cup
He made the move into cars for the 2007 season by entering the Renault Clio Cup which runs on the British Touring Car Championship support package. Driving for Mardi Gras Motorsport, he finished his debut season placed 13th in the championship with a best result of 4th at Thruxton.

Taylor-Smith stayed with the team for 2008 finishing 9th. He also contested the 2008 Renault Clio Winter Cup with Team Pyro where he took his first Clio Cup pole position in the first race at Croft, followed by his first win in the same race. He won the four-race championship ahead of Phil House and future BTCC and WTCC driver Alex MacDowall. He raced with Team Pyro for the 2009 season. Once again he improved, finishing fourth in the championship having achieved three podiums including a win.

He switched to the Clio Cup Italia for 2010, finishing the season 4th overall with two wins and two pole positions. 2011 saw Taylor-Smith return to the UK championship with Team Pyro. He finished joint second to Paul Rivett in the championship after a close title decider at Brands Hatch.

British Touring Car Championship

Triple 8 Race Engineering (2011)
Taylor-Smith made his BTCC debut for Triple 8 Race Engineering at the Knockhill round of the 2011 British Touring Car Championship. He picked up a single point on his debut after finishing in 10th place. This was to be a one-off appearance as the Renault Clio Cup rejoined the TOCA package at Rockingham.

Motorbase Performance (2012–2013)

In 2012 raced for Redstone Racing in one of their NGTC engined Ford Focus STs. His teammates were Mat Jackson and Liam Griffin. In the season opening race at Brands Hatch, the bumper of his car was memorably pulled off by a recovery vehicle as it was towed out of a gravel trap. In June 2012 he demonstrated his Ford Focus ST BTCC car on the streets of Dublin during the Bavaria City Racing Festival in front of an estimated 110,000 fans. He came close to a podium finish at Knockhill and led at Rockingham until a safety car allowed his rivals to catch him. Taylor-Smith finally took his first podium finish at Silverstone by finishing third in the first race. He took his first win at the final event of the year at Brands Hatch, crossing the line ahead of champion Gordon Shedden in race two. He finished the year placed eighth in the final championship standings.

Taylor-Smith stayed with Motorbase for 2013, now driving a full NGTC specification Ford Focus ST as raced by Jackson in the second half of the 2012 season. He led Jackson in the standings for much of the season but ended the year ninth, one place behind Jackson. Neither driver won a race, however they both achieved several podiums.

Team BMR (2014–2015)
Taylor-Smith moved to Team BMR for the 2014 British Touring Car Championship, driving a Volkswagen CC alongside former champion Alain Menu. Taylor-Smith took two wins, one at Oulton Park and the other at Snetterton, and finished ninth in the final drivers' championship standings. Taylor-Smith remained with Team BMR for 2015, where he was joined by former champions, Colin Turkington and Jason Plato. He finished the year 11th overall claiming 6 podiums.

Team BKR (2016)
Taylor-Smith moved to the newly formed Team BKR for the 2016 season. He started the year strongly with podiums at both Brands Hatch and Donington Park. A win would come his way at Rockingham and he finished the year 14th overall.

MG RCIB Triple Eight Racing (2017)

Taylor-Smith moved once again this season, this time to Triple Eight Racing for the 2017 British Touring Car Championship season. He was the lead driver of the two car entry paired with Daniel Lloyd and was lucky to escape without serious injury from an accident at Croft that also involved Jeff Smith and Luke Davenport.

Team HARD (2021–) 
Having spent a year outside racing due to COVID-19 in 2020, Taylor-Smith returned to the BTCC in 2021 as part of the four-car Team HARD programme driving a new Cupra Leon.

Blancpain GT Series Sprint Cup

Team Parker Racing (2018)

British GT Championship 

Taylor-Smith drove with ex-BTCC driver Sam Smelt in a Ford Mustang GT4 in 2019. They finished 22nd in the championship with only 4 points, scored at Snetterton.

Racing record

Complete British Touring Car Championship results
(key) (Races in bold indicate pole position – 1 point awarded in first race; races in italics indicate fastest lap – 1 point awarded all races; * signifies that driver lead race for at least one lap – 1 point awarded all races)

Complete Blancpain GT Series Sprint Cup results

Complete British GT Championship results
(key) (Races in bold indicate pole position) (Races in italics indicate fastest lap)

References

External links
 
 British Touring Car Championship Official Website

1989 births
Irish racing drivers
Living people
Sportspeople from Dublin (city)
British Touring Car Championship drivers
Renault UK Clio Cup drivers